Valentina ("Valya") Ivanovna Tsybulskaya (born March 17, 1968, in Rostov-on-Don, Russia) is a Belarusian race walker. She has won World Championships silver and bronze medals, but no Olympic medals although she participated in 1996, 2000 and 2004.

Achievements

External links 

sports-reference

Belarusian female racewalkers
Athletes (track and field) at the 1996 Summer Olympics
Athletes (track and field) at the 2000 Summer Olympics
Athletes (track and field) at the 2004 Summer Olympics
1968 births
Living people
Olympic athletes of Belarus
World Athletics Championships medalists